The men's tanding 70 kilograms competition at the 2018 Asian Games took place from 23 to 27 August 2018 at Padepokan Pencak Silat, Taman Mini Indonesia Indah, Jakarta, Indonesia.

Pencak silat is traditional Indonesian martial arts. Pencak silat is assessed from a punch, kick, sweep, and dings. The target that must be addressed is the patron in the body of every fighter who competed. Each judge gives an individual score for each competitor. The score given to each boxer would be taken from all 5 judges.

A total of eleven competitors from eleven different countries competed in this Class E event, limited to fighters whose body weight was less than 70 kilograms.

Schedule
All times are Western Indonesia Time (UTC+07:00)

Results
Legend
WO — Won by walkover

References

External links
Official website

Men's tanding 70 kg